is a Japanese football player. He plays for Matsumoto Yamaga FC.

Club statistics
Updated to 23 February 2017.

1Includes J3 Relegation Playoffs.

References

External links
Profile at Zweigen Kanazawa

1991 births
Living people
Ryutsu Keizai University alumni
Association football people from Tochigi Prefecture
Japanese footballers
J1 League players
J2 League players
Tochigi SC players
Sagan Tosu players
Zweigen Kanazawa players
Matsumoto Yamaga FC players
Association football midfielders